Bohuslav Balbín (3 December 1621 – 29 November 1688) was a Czech writer, historian, geographer and Jesuit, called the "Czech Pliny". He became well known also as an advocate of the Czech language in the time of incoming germanization of the Czech lands.

Life

Balbín was born in Hradec Králové into a middle class Roman Catholic family. He was educated mostly in the Jesuit schools, he soon joined the Society of Jesus. After finishing studies in philosophy at University of Olomouc, he taught in Jesuit colleges in Prague, Třeboň, Brno, Jičín, Jindřichův Hradec and Český Krumlov.

After writing of several textbooks and didactic theatre plays, he also became acquainted with historical sources of archives and libraries. His entire life was devoted to collecting and editing materials about Czech history, and his researches have often been utilized by the Bollandists. Balbín died, aged 66, in Prague.

Work 

He wrote over thirty works, the most important from which is Miscellanea Historica regni Bohemiae ("Varieties from the History of the Czech Kingdom" ", 6 vols., Prague, 1679–87), in which he described the geography, natural history, and chief historical events of his native land. The work includes brief vitae of prominent Czechs.
The sections of the work: 
Miscellanea historica regni Bohemiae - History of the kingdom of Bohemia 
Liber naturalis - The Nature of Bohemia 
Liber popularis - The population 
Liber chorographicus - Topography 
Liber hagiographicus – Czech Saints
Liber parochialis – The Parishes 
Liber episcopalis - The Archdiocese of Prague 
Liber regalis - Rulers
Liber epistolaris - Series of letters
Bohemia Docta - Czech literature and teaching 
Liber de seu curialis magistratibus et officiis curialibus regem Bohemiae - Paper on Courts and Offices of the Czech Crown

Bohuslav Balbín (Balbinus) is known in Czech Lands mostly for his "Apology for the Slavic and especially Czech language", written in Latin. He was the first to edit the ancient chronicle of the tenth century known as the Life of St. Ludmilla and Martyrdom of St. Wenceslas, which is considered the oldest historical work written in the Czech lands by a Czech (written in Latin). Balbinus wrote also De archiepiscopis Bohemiae ("The Archbishops of Bohemia", Prague, 1682) and Bohemia Sancta, sive de sanctis Bohemiae, Moraviae, Silesiae, Lusatiae ("Sacred Bohemia, or the Saints of Bohemia, Moravia, Silesia and Lusatia" Prague, 1682). His book Vita beatae Joannis Nepomuceni martyris (Life of Saint and martyr John of Nepomuk) was published in Prague, 1670,  is in large part responsible for the developed legend of Saint John of Nepomuk. Balbin also wrote one reference book about stylistics (1666) and two works devoted to rhetoric (1677, 1688)

Bibliography 
 Legatio Apollinis coelestis ad universitatem Pragensem etc.
 Vita venerabilis Arnesti (biography of Arnošt of Pardubice, the first Archbishop of Prague), 1664
 Verisimilia humaniorum disciplinarunm seu judicium privatum de omni letterarum, quasi humaniores appellent, artificio. 1666.
 Dissertatio apologetica pro lingua Slavonica, praecipue Bohemica. 1775. (In Czech: Obrana jazyka slovanského, zvláště českého. 1869)
 Vita S. Joannis Nepomuceni sigilli sacramentalis protomartyris
 Epitome rerum Bohemicarum seu historia Boleslaviensis, 1677 (The book about history of Stará Boleslav)
 Quaesita oratoria seu eloquentiae praecepta. 1677
 De archiepiscopis Bohemiae
 Brevis tractatio de amplificatione oratoria. 1688 
 Miscellanea historica regni Bohemiae, 1679–88
 Vita et passio sancti Wenceslai et sanctae Ludmilae aviae eius

See also
 List of Czech writers

References

External links
Catholic Encyclopedia: "Boleslaus Balbinus"
Bohuslav Balbín at Czechoslovak book network Baila.net

Czech male writers
Czech philosophers
Czech Jesuits
17th-century Bohemian historians
Linguists from the Czech Republic
Czech geographers
Writers from Hradec Králové
1621 births
1688 deaths
Palacký University Olomouc alumni
Holy Roman Empire philosophers